The 2020–21 Cal State Northridge Matadors men's basketball team represented California State University, Northridge in the 2020–21 NCAA Division I men's basketball season. The Matadors, led by third-year head coach Mark Gottfried, played their home games at the Matadome in Northridge, California as members of the Big West Conference.

Previous season
The Matadors finished the 2019–20 season 15–17, 10–6 in Big West play to finish in a tie for second place. They were set to be the No. 2 seed in the Big West tournament, and face Cal State Fullerton, however, the tournament was cancelled amid the COVID-19 pandemic.

Roster

Schedule and results 

|-
!colspan=12 style=| Regular season

|-
!colspan=12 style=| Big West tournament
|-

|-

Source

References

Cal State Northridge Matadors men's basketball seasons
Cal State Northridge Matadors
Cal State Northridge Matadors men's basketball
Cal State Northridge Matadors men's basketball